Zilberstein (name) may refer to:
Osher Zilberstein,  European-born American rabbi.
Yitzchok Zilberstein, Polish-born Haredi rabbi in Israel.
Lilya Zilberstein,  Russian pianist.